Muro Leccese is a town and comune of 4948 inhabitants (2016), in the province of Lecce, in the Apulia region of south-east Italy.

History

Main sights
Messapic walls (3rd-4th centuries BC)

References 

Cities and towns in Apulia
Localities of Salento